Paris quadrifolia, the herb Paris or true lover's knot, is a species of flowering plant in the family Melanthiaceae. It occurs in temperate and cool areas throughout Eurasia, from Spain to Yakutia, and from Iceland to Mongolia. It prefers calcareous soils and lives in damp and shady places, especially old established woods and stream banks.

P. quadrifolia is in decline in Europe due to loss of habitat. In Iceland, for example, it is on the red list.

Characteristics
It may have 3–8 leaves but typically there are four leaves arranged as opposing pairs. The flowers are wispy and inconspicuous.

The plant flowers during the months of June and July. It has a solitary flower with four narrow greenish filiform (threadlike) petals, four green petaloid sepals, eight golden yellow stamens, and a round purple to red ovary. The flower is borne above a single whorl of four leaves.

Each plant produces at most one blueberry-like berry, which is poisonous, as are other plant tissues. Poisonings are rare because the plant's solitary berry has a repulsive taste that makes it difficult to mistake for a bilberry.

Gallery

References

External links
 HoloGuides - photos

Melanthiaceae
Flora of Europe
Flora of Asia
Plants described in 1753
Taxa named by Carl Linnaeus